The Wireless Information Networking Laboratory (WINLAB) at Yeungnam University, Gyeongsan, South Korea, was founded to carry out the extensive research in wireless communication. WINLAB contributed many research articles in many reputed world class journals in wireless networks, mobile networks, and embedded system areas. Some of the research areas  they contributed are: 
 Wireless networks: Protocol design and performance evaluation in wireless PAN/LAN/MAN/RAN, Cognitive radio.
 Ad hoc networks: Wireless sensor networks, wireless mesh networks, and mobile ad hoc networks.
 Mobile networks: Access control, handoff, power control, routing, and admission control.
 Standard: IEEE 802.11/15/16/20/21/22.
 Embedded system: ASIC, SoC, and embedded controller.
Professor Kim Sung Won, Ph.D. is the adviser of this laboratory.

Goals and Missions
The mission of WIN laboratory is to conduct research and education in the field of Wireless Communication Engineering and to develop industry partnerships to solve significant issues of interest in telecommunication.

Wireless communication is the transfer of information over a distance without the use of enhanced electrical conductors or "wires". The distances involved may be short (a few meters as in television remote control) or long (thousands or millions of kilometers for radio communications). When the context is clear, the term is often shortened to "wireless". Wireless communication is generally considered to be a branch of telecommunications.

See also

Yeungnam University
Education in South Korea
Process Systems Design and Control Laboratory

Notes and references

 Wireless Information Networking Laboratory Homepage
 BK21 Scholarship Program

External links
Yeungnam University Official website
The Korean Society of Industrial and Engineering
International Federation of Automatic Control

Universities and colleges in North Gyeongsang Province
Universities and colleges in Daegu